The shorthand for the instrumentation of a symphony orchestra (and other similar ensembles) is used to outline which and how many instruments, especially wind instruments, are called for in a given piece of music. The shorthand is ordered in the same fashion as the parts of the individual instruments in the score (when read from top to bottom).

General approach

The orchestra is divided into four groups and specified as follows:

 Woodwind instruments: flutes, oboes, clarinets, saxophones (if one or more are needed), bassoons
 Brass instruments: horns, trumpets, trombones, tubas
 Percussion: timpani, snare drum, bass drum, chimes, etc.
 Keyboard instruments: celesta, organ, piano
 String instruments: harp, violins, violas, cellos, basses, frequently abbreviated to 'str', 'strs' or similar.

If any soloists or a choir are called for, their parts are usually printed between the percussion/keyboards and the strings in the score. 

The basic order of the instruments, as seen above, is common to all of the shorthand systems. However, there is no standardized version of this shorthand; different publishers and librarians use different systems, especially for doubling/alternate/additional instruments. David Daniels, in earlier versions of his influential work that collects in print a catalog of the instrumentations of some 4,000+ pieces, made use of a shorthand for doubling/alternate/additional instruments which was less clear, but in the newer online version Daniels' approach has been refined to something more explicit, akin to the Chester Novello and Boosey & Hawkes notations below.

Examples for different notations (the instrumentation of John Adams' Harmonielehre is used here as an example):

Examples 

An example of another approach, particularly useful where there may be extensive versatility required from doubling players, is given here for The Phantom of the Opera for a 45-part orchestra, taken from the Chester/Novello Hire Library:
WW1(fl,pic).WW2(fl).WW3(cl).WW4(ob,ca).WW5(cl,bcl).WW6(bn)/3hn.3tpt.3tbn.tuba/2perc/hp.2kbd/str(85443 players)

Sources
Klaus Haller, Elfriede Witte (eds.): Regeln für die alphabetische Katalogisierung von Ausgaben musikalischer Werke (RAK-Musik). Leipzig 2004 (pdf; 561 kB).

Notes

Musical instruments
Musical notation